Čeladenka is a small river in the Moravian-Silesian Region of the Czech Republic, with the source in the Moravian-Silesian Beskids, flowing through the village of Čeladná and entering the Ostravice at Frýdlant nad Ostravicí.

Sources
Moravskoslezské Beskydy. Tourist map 1:50 000. Shocart: Zlín 2002 
Najbrt Přemysl: Beskydy a Valašsko. Průvodce. Olympia: Praha 1974
Beskydy. Turistický průvodce ČSSR, vol. 8. Olympia: Praha 1982

External links
Povodí Odry: levels and flows on watercourses - Čeladenka
ČHMÚ: Evidenční list hlásného profilu č.280 - Čeladenka

Moravian-Silesian Beskids
Rivers of the Moravian-Silesian Region